Oleh Kukharyk (born 24 April 1997) is a Ukrainian sprint canoer. He is a 2021 World champion, bronze medallists of the 2017 and 2022 World Championships as well as a silver medallist of the 2018 European Championships.

He graduated from the Vasyl Sukhomlynskyi National University of Mykolayiv.

References

External links

Ukrainian male canoeists
Living people
1997 births
Canoeists at the 2019 European Games
European Games medalists in canoeing
European Games silver medalists for Ukraine
Recipients of the Order of Merit (Ukraine), 3rd class
ICF Canoe Sprint World Championships medalists in kayak
21st-century Ukrainian people